The 2013 Stadium Super Trucks Series was the inaugural season of Stadium Super Trucks competition. The series marked the revival of off-road racing in stadiums, originally created by Mickey Thompson, and reintroduced by former NASCAR driver Robby Gordon. The trucks were one of four classes available, along with Bigfoot Monster Trucks, Super Trophy Karts, and Super Buggys.

The champion was awarded the Mickey Thompson Championship Trophy. Gordon won the championship by seven points over Rob MacCachren.

Drivers

Schedule

Season summary
Robby Gordon organized an exhibition race at Crandon International Off-Road Raceway in September 2012 for the series to test their equipment. Numerous TORC and LOORS off-road drivers were invited to participate.

The opening race of the season, at University of Phoenix Stadium, initially was led by Justin Matney until Lalo Laguna passed him on lap 2. However, Laguna lost the lead to Rob MacCachren after hitting the water barrier and MacCachren dominated the rest of the race. Next, the series traveled to Long Beach for the Grand Prix of Long Beach, where ramps were added to the track. Justin Lofton won the race. SST remained in southern California at the Los Angeles Memorial Coliseum, racing on the first asphalt track laid in the stadium, and at Qualcomm Stadium in San Diego, where future series and NASCAR Gander RV & Outdoors Truck Series champion Sheldon Creed made his debut.

At the Edward Jones Dome, MacCachren triumphed. The next race was scheduled to occur at Soldier Field, but was eventually canceled. Dates at the Georgia Dome, Cowboys Stadium, and the Hubert H. Humphrey Metrodome were also called off. The Honda Indy Toronto road course was a late addition to the series schedule as a doubleheader. Justin Lofton and Creed won the Saturday and Sunday races, respectively.

The next stop was Crandon, with MacCachren claiming his fourth win of the season in the first race on Friday night. In the second race on Sunday afternoon, the trucks raced the track in the opposite direction for the second half of the 12-lap event. Creed and Jerett Brooks battled for the win, with the latter winning.

The next three rounds were held at Sand Sports Super Show. Robby Gordon dueled with Lofton throughout the first race until Lofton struck a water barrier as Gordon won. Lofton subsequently suffered from mechanical issues and finished fifth. In the next round, pole-sitter Mike Jenkins entered turn 2 too quickly and rolled over, giving Apdaly Lopez the lead, though Lofton passed him. As in the previous race, Lofton and Gordon battled for the victory, but a miscue by Gordon allowed Lofton to get the win. Lofton and Gordon continued to dominate the track as they started first and second, respectively, in the third race. With the invert, Lopez led, and at the lap six restart, Gordon suffered damage to his truck and rolled over. Gordon was able to make a late charge, but Creed eventually won.

The season finale was held at Caesars Palace in Las Vegas, held concurrently with the SEMA auto show. In the race, P. J. Jones claimed his first win of the season, while Gordon won the championship by just seven points over MacCachren.

Results and standings

Race results

Drivers' championship

Notes

References

Stadium Super Trucks
Stadium Super Trucks